Lacrimal fossa can refer to:
  Fossa for lacrimal gland
  Fossa for lacrimal sac